Gerald Williams is a Welsh former professional rugby league footballer who represented South Africa at the 1995 World Cup.

Playing career
He then played for the Warrington Wolves in the 1995-96 Rugby Football League.

References

Living people
South African rugby league players
South Africa national rugby league team players
Place of birth missing (living people)
1968 births
Rugby league second-rows
Warrington Wolves players
South African expatriate rugby league players
Expatriate rugby league players in England
South African expatriate sportspeople in England